The  is a rifle grenade used by the JGSDF. It can be launched from the Howa Type 89 or Howa Type 64 rifles without other attachments.

History
The JGSDF did not adopt the US-made M203 grenade launcher for general use after a thorough examination. Development of the Type 06 rifle grenade began in 1998 by the JGSDF Ground Research and Development Command after evaluations were done in 2001 and in 2005. The Type 06 was finished and adopted by the JGSDF in 2006, being manufactured by Daikin Industries under its Defense Systems Division.

The Type 06 had been fired first in exercises done by the JGSDF's 3rd Mechanized Infantry Regiment. It has been subsequently shown in various war game exercises.

Description
The grenade does not need a launching attachment, because it was designed for riflemen and not for grenadiers. However, a simplified aiming sight can be attached. It contains a HEAT warhead for defeating tank armor. It is also equipped with a built-in time fuse for safety upon failure of the contact fuse.

See also
 Rifle grenade

References

Anti-tank grenades
Post–Cold War weapons of Japan
Rifle grenades
Grenades of Japan
Daikin